Thérèse Louise Marie Denise De Chazal  (25 July 1887 – 27 February 1971) was a Mauritian politician. In 1948 she became one of the first two female members of the Legislative Council, serving until 1953.

Biography
De Chazal was born Thérèse Louise Marie Denise Baissac, the daughter of Marie Thérèse Louise (née Sauzier) and Louis Edmond Baissac. She married Edmond Marc De Chazal  in August 1906 at St Thérèse church in Curepipe, after which she moved to South Africa, where Edmond had been working since 1904. The couple returned to Mauritius in 1908 and had a daughter named Pauline in 1916. She was awarded an MBE in the 1939 New Year Honours for social and charitable services.

Following the 1948 Legislative Council elections, De Chazal was appointed as one of the twelve nominated members, joining Emilienne Rochecouste as one of the two female members of the Legislative Council.  She was not reappointed following the 1953 elections.

She was a co-founder of the Maternity and Child Welfare Association, heading it for twenty years. She later became honorary chair of the organisation, a role she held until her death in 1971.

References

1887 births
Mauritian women in politics
Members of the National Assembly (Mauritius)
Members of the Order of the British Empire
1971 deaths